Double take may refer to:

Films, radio, and television
 Double Take (1998 film), a 1998 thriller
 Double Take (2001 film), a 2001 comedy
 Double Take (2009 film), a 2009 film
 Double Take (American TV series), a 2018 hidden camera/practical joke reality streaming television series
 Double Take (Australian TV series), a 2009 sketch comedy
 "Double Take" (Code Lyoko), a Code Lyoko episode
 Doubletake, a British television comedy
 Doubletake, a 1985 two-episode television miniseries with Richard Crenna
 Double Take, an episode from the animated TV series The Sylvester & Tweety Mysteries

Other
 Double-take (comedy), an expression of surprise in body language
 Double Take (Freddie Hubbard and Woody Shaw album), 1985
 Double Take (Petra album), 2000
 Double-Take (NSI Product), business continuity software
 Double Take (group), an American female pop duo
 Double Take Comics, a defunct comic book publisher
 Double Take, the exercise term for Defcon level 4

See also
 The Take (disambiguation)